Phithack Kongmathilath (Lao: ພິທັກ ກອງມາທິລາດ; born 6 August 1996) is a Laotian professional footballer who currently plays as a midfielder for Nakhon Pathom United in the Thai League 2.

Career statistics

International

International goals
Scores and results list Laos' goal tally first.

References

1996 births
Living people
Laotian footballers
Laos international footballers
Association football midfielders
Lanexang United F.C. players
Lao Army F.C. players
Phithack Kongmathilath
Competitors at the 2019 Southeast Asian Games
Competitors at the 2021 Southeast Asian Games
Southeast Asian Games competitors for Laos